The men's luge at the 2018 Winter Olympics was held between 10 and 11 February 2018 at the Alpensia Sliding Centre near Pyeongchang, South Korea.

The event was won by David Gleirscher, who became the first Austrian to win men's luge since 1968. Chris Mazdzer won the silver medal, whereas  Johannes Ludwig won the bronze. For all of them, this was the first Olympic medal, and the Mazdzer's medal is the first ever medal for the United States in men's singles luge. This is the first time since 1988 than none of the medalists in men's luge had a medal of previous Olympics. The favorite and the defending Olympic champion, Felix Loch, was leading the field after three runs, but in the last run made a mistake which cost him a medal.

Qualifying athletes
The field included the 2010 and the 2014 Olympic champion Felix Loch, who is also the 2017–18 Luge World Cup winner, the 2016–17 Luge World Cup winner Roman Repilov, and Wolfgang Kindl who finished second in the 2017–18 Luge World Cup. None of them won a medal.

Competition schedule
All times are (UTC+9).

Results
Four runs, split over two days, were used to determine the winner.

References

Luge at the 2018 Winter Olympics
Men's events at the 2018 Winter Olympics